Edward Lee Hunter (born January 20, 1965) is a former American football running back in the National Football League who played for the New York Jets and Tampa Bay Buccaneers. He played college football for the Virginia Tech Hokies.

References

1965 births
Living people
American football running backs
New York Jets players
Tampa Bay Buccaneers players
Virginia Tech Hokies football players
National Football League replacement players